Sir Charles David Griffin CBE (8 July 1915 – 25 March 2004) was an Australian lawyer and businessman, and the Lord Mayor of Sydney from 1972 to 1973. He was a prisoner of war at Changi in Singapore during World War II, and a poet.

Always known as David, Griffin was born in Leura in the Blue Mountains and was educated at Cranbrook. In 1941 he sailed for Malaya and was present in Singapore at its fall to the Japanese in 1942. A prisoner of war in Changi for three years, he was released in 1945.

He returned to the legal profession in Sydney. He was elected to the council of the City of Sydney in 1962 representing the Civic Reform Association, before becoming Lord Mayor in 1972.

Griffin had been involved in radio and the theatre, and in 2002 published a book of poems written in Changi, including The Happiness Box.  While in Changi, he collected many poems written by Australian and British soldiers there, and kept them in a cardboard box for over 45 years before releasing them.  He retired to Mittagong in the Southern Highlands of New South Wales, and died on 25 March 2004.

Honours
In 1972 Griffin was appointed a Commander of the Order of the British Empire for "services to industry", and appointed a Knight Bachelor in 1974 for "services to the community".

References

External links
Obituary The Daily Telegraph, 10 April 2004 
Changi Days – transcript of "Compass" programme by Geraldine Doogue includes reminiscences by Griffin and his wife, Jean
  

1915 births
2004 deaths
Australian Army personnel of World War II
Australian Knights Bachelor
Australian Commanders of the Order of the British Empire
Civic Reform Association politicians
Mayors and Lord Mayors of Sydney
World War II prisoners of war held by Japan
People educated at Cranbrook School, Sydney
Australian prisoners of war